Brian Turner Tom Lawrence  (9 November 1873 – 7 June 1949) was an English recipient of the Victoria Cross, the highest and most prestigious award for gallantry in the face of the enemy that can be awarded to British and Commonwealth forces. He also competed at the 1912 Summer Olympics.

Life
Born in Bewdley, Worcestershire, the eldest of five brothers, and the son of Hannah and John Lawrence, a timber merchant of 15, Lower Park, Bewdley. Lawrence was a former pupil of King Charles I Grammar School, Kidderminster.

Lawrence was 26 years old, and a sergeant in the 17th Lancers (Duke of Cambridge's Own), British Army during the Second Boer War when the following deed took place for which he was awarded the VC.

Lawrence received the decoration from King Edward VII in London on 12 August 1902, during a review of colonial troops present for the coronation of the King.

Later military career
Lawrence later served in World War I and World War II and reached the rank of lieutenant-colonel in the 18th Royal Hussars (later 13th/18th Royal Hussars).

Olympics
He competed in the 1912 Summer Olympics for Great Britain in eventing. He did not finish the Individual eventing (Military) competition, also the British team did not finish the team event.

The medal
The medal is on display at the Lord Ashcroft VC Gallery in the Imperial War Museum in London.

References

Sources
Monuments to Courage (David Harvey, 1999)
The Register of the Victoria Cross (This England, 1997)
Victoria Crosses of the Anglo-Boer War (Ian Uys, 2000)

External links
external link British Olympic Association

Second Boer War recipients of the Victoria Cross
British recipients of the Victoria Cross
17th Lancers soldiers
18th Royal Hussars officers
13th/18th Royal Hussars officers
1873 births
1949 deaths
Equestrians at the 1912 Summer Olympics
Olympic equestrians of Great Britain
British male equestrians
British event riders
People from Bewdley
British Army personnel of the Second Boer War
British Army personnel of World War I
Military Knights of Windsor
British Army recipients of the Victoria Cross
English emigrants to Kenya
Military personnel from Worcestershire
British Army personnel of World War II
Burials in Kenya